Maungatapere is a settlement in Northland, New Zealand. State Highway 14 runs through it. Whangārei is 11 km to the east, and Tangiteroria is 18 km to the south west. The settlement takes its name from a rounded volcanic peak of the same name (a Maori name meaning "meeting house by the mountain") that lies to the southwest, and has a summit 359 meters above sea level.

Maungatapere is at the junction of State Highways 14 and 15.

Maungatapere is the antipode of the city of Tangier, Morocco.

History
Thomas Elmsley bought  of land in Maungatapere and northern Wairoa from Te Tirarau Kukupa in 1839, and in 1840 he and the brothers Henry and Charles Walton came with workers to establish farms in the area. Henry Walton's farm was on the slopes of Maungatapere Mountain and was called "Maungatapere Park". After the Flagstaff War, Walton employed former soldiers to build stone walls which are still a feature of the area. Henry Walton married Kohura, Te Tirarau Kukupa's niece, in 1846. After she died in childbirth, he married her sister, Pehi, but she died in a measles epidemic in 1856. Walton built a road between Maungatapere and Whangarei in 1858. He also became involved in coal mining and shipbuilding, and was one of the partners in the timber mill at Te Kōpuru. Walton was one of the founding shareholders in the Bank of New Zealand. In 1863 he became a member of the New Zealand Legislative Council and two years later he was elected to the Auckland Provincial Council. However, in 1867 he left New Zealand and returned to England.

Demographics
Statistics New Zealand describes Maungatapere as a rural settlement. The settlement is part of the larger Maungatapere statistical area.

Maungatapere settlement had a population of 264 at the 2018 New Zealand census, an increase of 33 people (14.3%) since the 2013 census, and an increase of 33 people (14.3%) since the 2006 census. There were 78 households, comprising 129 males and 132 females, giving a sex ratio of 0.98 males per female, with 72 people (27.3%) aged under 15 years, 33 (12.5%) aged 15 to 29, 108 (40.9%) aged 30 to 64, and 51 (19.3%) aged 65 or older.

Ethnicities were 84.1% European/Pākehā, 27.3% Māori, 1.1% Pacific peoples, 3.4% Asian, and 0.0% other ethnicities. People may identify with more than one ethnicity.

Although some people chose not to answer the census's question about religious affiliation, 50.0% had no religion, 39.8% were Christian and 2.3% had other religions.

Of those at least 15 years old, 24 (12.5%) people had a bachelor's or higher degree, and 45 (23.4%) people had no formal qualifications. 18 people (9.4%) earned over $70,000 compared to 17.2% nationally. The employment status of those at least 15 was that 87 (45.3%) people were employed full-time, 33 (17.2%) were part-time, and 6 (3.1%) were unemployed.

Maungatapere statistical area

Maungatapere statistical area had a population of 3,477 at the 2018 New Zealand census, an increase of 483 people (16.1%) since the 2013 census, and an increase of 720 people (26.1%) since the 2006 census. There were 1,191 households, comprising 1,764 males and 1,713 females, giving a sex ratio of 1.03 males per female. The median age was 43.7 years (compared with 37.4 years nationally), with 756 people (21.7%) aged under 15 years, 501 (14.4%) aged 15 to 29, 1,659 (47.7%) aged 30 to 64, and 564 (16.2%) aged 65 or older.

Ethnicities were 89.0% European/Pākehā, 19.0% Māori, 1.2% Pacific peoples, 2.9% Asian, and 2.2% other ethnicities. People may identify with more than one ethnicity.

The percentage of people born overseas was 16.2, compared with 27.1% nationally.

Although some people chose not to answer the census's question about religious affiliation, 55.0% had no religion, 34.8% were Christian, 0.3% were Hindu, 0.3% were Muslim, 0.3% were Buddhist and 2.7% had other religions.

Of those at least 15 years old, 531 (19.5%) people had a bachelor's or higher degree, and 468 (17.2%) people had no formal qualifications. The median income was $36,500, compared with $31,800 nationally. 531 people (19.5%) earned over $70,000 compared to 17.2% nationally. The employment status of those at least 15 was that 1,446 (53.1%) people were employed full-time, 516 (19.0%) were part-time, and 63 (2.3%) were unemployed.

Education
Maungatapere School is a coeducational full primary (years 1-8) school with a roll of  students (as of  The school celebrated its 125th jubilee in 2004.

Notes

External links
 Maungatapere School website

Whangarei District
Populated places in the Northland Region